The GelreDome is a football stadium in the city of Arnhem, Netherlands. Built from 1996 to 1998 at a cost equivalent to €75 million, that opened on 25 March 1998. The stadium has been the home of association football club Vitesse Arnhem since 1998. It was one of the stadiums used during Euro 2000 tournament held in the Netherlands and Belgium.

Both international and Dutch artists have given concerts in the stadium, including Lady Gaga, Pearl Jam, Bruce Springsteen, Tina Turner, Celine Dion, Madonna, Prince, Spice Girls, Justin Bieber, Paul McCartney, Shakira, Iron Maiden, AC/DC, André Rieu, The Rolling Stones, Justin Timberlake and Rihanna.

The stadium has a retractable roof, as well as a convertible pitch, that can be retracted, when unused during concerts or other events held at the stadium, and a climate control system. It has a capacity of 34,000 people for sports events, or 41,000 during concerts. The GelreDome pitch is surrounded on each side by four covered all-seater stands, officially known as the Edward Sturing Stand (North), Charly Bosveld Stand (East), Theo Bos Stand (South) and Just Göbel Stand (West).

The GelreDome currently holds a four-star rating by UEFA.

History

The GelreDome replaced the Nieuw Monnikenhuize Stadion as Vitesse's home ground on 25 March 1998. Plans had been afoot to expand and to renovate the old and now demolished Nieuw Monnikenhuize. However, with a growing fan capacity and with arguments that the location of the old stadium was not strategic enough, the idea was conceived to build a new arena for the Vitesse fans.

The first match played at the stadium was a 4–1 victory by the home team against N.A.C. Breda in an Eredivisie match. The first goal in the new stadium was scored by Vitesse player Dejan Čurović.

International matches
Three international matches of the Netherlands national football team were played in the stadium, the first one being on May 27, 1998: a friendly against Cameroon (0–1). The last one, played on April 26, 2000, was also a friendly: a 0–0 against Scotland. In 2019, the Netherlands women's national team, also played their an international (friendly) match at the stadium. Furthermore, the GelreDome was the location for three UEFA Euro 2000 group stage matches, as well as the 2007 UEFA European Under-21 Championship tournament.

Euro 2000 matches

UEFA U21 2007 matches

Davis Cup 2003

Kickboxing

Concerts
Since opening in 1998, GelreDome has hosted hundreds of concerts from Dutch and international superstars, including the Spice Girls, who became the first music act to perform at the stadium, as well as Bruce Springsteen and the E Street Band, Helene Fischer, U2, Backstreet Boys, Janet Jackson, Bon Jovi, Britney Spears, Tiësto, Madonna, Coldplay, Sting, Diana Ross, Tina Turner, Rihanna, Lady Gaga, Iron Maiden, AC/DC, Shakira, Justin Bieber, Celine Dion, The Rolling Stones, Imagine Dragons and Justin Timberlake. The arena also hosts Qlimax, a Q-dance event from 2003–present.

Recently, Lady Gaga embarked her stadium tour The Chromatica Ball in Arnhem, Netherlands at Gelredome on 26 July 2022 with a crowd of approximately 30,000.

Museum 
The Vitesse Museum is located in the stadium, which shows Vitesse's more than 126 years of history.

Transport 
The stadium can be reached by a 10-minute bike ride from the Arnhem main railway station. Bus lines 7 and 331, departing from the Arnhem railway station, call at the 'GelreDome-stadion' bus stop, just outside the stadium.

Gallery

References

External links

 

SBV Vitesse
Sports venues completed in 1998
UEFA Euro 2000 stadiums in the Netherlands
Retractable-pitch stadiums
Retractable-roof stadiums in Europe
Football venues in the Netherlands
Sports venues in Arnhem